The SeeYa (stylized as "The SEEYA") was a South Korean R&B girl group that consisted of Minkyung, Youngjoo, Yoojin and Yeonkyung. They debuted on November 12, 2012 with the single album Good To Seeya featuring the title track "Be With You". They had their debut stage on November 15, 2012 at M! Countdown. In the last part of 2015, their profile page was removed and many speculated the group disbanded.

History

2012–13: Debut with  Good To Seeya  and  Love U
Their debut single, "Be With You", was released in two versions, the main version featuring former Speed member Taewoon and the other version is female only. One of the music videos featured actors Joo Sang-wook and Im Jung-eun with direction by Chang (Death Bell). The debut single album Good To Seeya was released in November 12. The SeeYa released their first mini album, Love U, in December.

In June 2013, Core Contents Media released
digital song "Painkiller". The song was a collaboration with T-ara, The SeeYa, F-ve dolls and Speed.

In July 2013, Yeonkyung was confirmed to be joining girl group F-ve Dolls. She will simultaneously promote as a member of both groups.

2014: Tears, Love Is and Crazy Love
The SeeYa was released two single album In January 2014. The group's released their second single-album Tears with title track called "More & More" on January 3 and released their third single-album Love Is with title track called "Tell Me" on January 21.

End of 2014, The SeeYa released their fourth single-album Crazy Love with title track called "The Song Of Love" collaboration with EXID's LE  was released In December 29.

2015: U & Me and Disbandment
On February 10, 2015, MBK Entertainment artists consists : T-ara, Speed, The SeeYa and Cho Seunghee made their participation on MBK project group called "TS" and was released winter song called "Don't Forget Me".

In March 2015, MBK confirmed that F-ve Dolls was disbanded and later Yeonkyung would only focus on promoting with The SeeYa.

On 21 April 2015, The Seeya released their fifth single U & ME with title track "Wedding March".

In November 2015, MBK Entertainment removed the group's profile page from their official website. The group ultimately disbanded.

On May 18, 2016 Yoojin made appearance on SBS' War of Vocals - God's Voice. She also confirmed that The SeeYa has disbanded.

Members
 Minkyung (민경)
 Youngjoo (영주)
 Yoojin (유진)
 Yeonkyung (연경)

Discography

EPs

Singles

References

External links
 The SeeYa Official Website

MBK Entertainment artists
Musical groups established in 2012
South Korean girl groups
2012 establishments in South Korea
Musical groups from Seoul
Musical groups disestablished in 2016